Qeshlaq-e Farajollah Qadir (also Romanized as Qeshlāq-e Farajollah Qadīr; also known as Qeshlāq-e Farajollāh) is a village in Qeshlaq-e Gharbi Rural District, Aslan Duz District, Parsabad County, Ardabil Province, Iran. At the 2006 census, its population was 60, in 10 families.

References 

Towns and villages in Parsabad County